Nagle's algorithm is a  means of improving the efficiency of TCP/IP networks by reducing the number of packets that need to be sent over the network. It was defined by John Nagle while working for Ford Aerospace.

The RFC describes what he called the "small-packet problem", where an application repeatedly emits data in small chunks, frequently only 1 byte in size. Since TCP packets have a 40-byte header (20 bytes for TCP, 20 bytes for IPv4), this results in a 41-byte packet for 1 byte of useful information, a huge overhead. This situation often occurs in Telnet sessions, where most keypresses generate a single byte of data that is transmitted immediately. Worse, over slow links, many such packets can be in transit at the same time, potentially leading to congestion collapse.

Nagle's algorithm works by combining a number of small outgoing messages and sending them all at once. Specifically, as long as there is a sent packet for which the sender has received no acknowledgment, the sender should keep buffering its output until it has a full packet's worth of output, thus allowing output to be sent all at once.

Algorithm

The RFC defines the algorithm as
inhibit the sending of new TCP segments when new outgoing data arrives from the user if any previously transmitted data on the connection remains unacknowledged.

Where MSS is the maximum segment size, the largest segment that can be sent on this connection, and the window size is the currently acceptable window of unacknowledged data, this can be written in pseudocode as
 if there is new data to send then
     if the window size ≥ MSS and available data is ≥ MSS then
         send complete MSS segment now
     else
         if there is unconfirmed data still in the pipe then
             enqueue data in the buffer until an acknowledge is received
         else
             send data immediately
         end if
     end if
 end if

Interaction with delayed ACK 
This algorithm interacts badly with TCP delayed acknowledgments (delayed ACK), a feature introduced into TCP at roughly the same time in the early 1980s, but by a different group. With both algorithms enabled, applications that do two successive writes to a TCP connection, followed by a read that will not be fulfilled until after the data from the second write has reached the destination, experience a constant delay of up to 500 milliseconds, the "ACK delay". It is recommended to disable either, although traditionally it's easier to disable Nagle, since such a switch already exists for real-time applications.

A solution recommended by Nagle is to avoid the algorithm sending premature packets by buffering up application writes and then flushing the buffer:
The user-level solution is to avoid write–write–read sequences on sockets. Write–read–write–read is fine. Write–write–write is fine. But write–write–read is a killer. So, if you can, buffer up your little writes to TCP and send them all at once. Using the standard UNIX I/O package and flushing write before each read usually works.

Nagle considers delayed ACKs a "bad idea", since the application layer does not usually respond within the time window. For typical use cases, he recommends disabling "delayed ACK" instead of his algorithm, as "quick" ACKs do not incur as much overhead as many small packets do.

Disabling either Nagle or delayed ACK 
TCP implementations usually provide applications with an interface to disable the Nagle algorithm. This is typically called the TCP_NODELAY option. On Microsoft Windows the TcpNoDelay registry switch decides the default. TCP_NODELAY is present since the TCP/IP stack in 4.2BSD of 1983, a stack with many descendents.

The interface for disabling delayed ACK is not consistent among systems. Setting TcpAckFrequency to 1 in the Windows registry turns off delayed ACK by default.

Negative effect on larger writes
The Nagle algorithm applies to data writes of any size. If the data in a single write spans 2n packets, where there are 2n-1 full-sized TCP segments followed by a partial TCP segment, the original Nagle algorithm would withhold the last packet, waiting for either more data to send (to fill the packet), or the ACK for the previous packet (indicating that all the previous packets have left the network).

In any non-pipelined stop-and-wait request-response application protocol where request data can be larger than a packet, this can artificially impose a few hundred milliseconds latency between the requester and the responder. Originally this was not felt to be a problem, since any non-pipelined stop-and-wait protocol is probably not designed to achieve high performance in the first place, so a few hundred milliseconds extra delay should make little difference. A later refinement to Nagle’s algorithm, called Minshall’s Modification, solved this problem with stop-and-wait protocols that send one short message and then wait for an acknowledgement before sending the next, removing the incentive for them to disable Nagle’s algorithm (though such protocols will still be limited by their design to one message exchange per network round-trip time).

In general, since Nagle's algorithm is only a defense against careless applications, disabling Nagle’s algorithm will not benefit most carefully written applications that take proper care of buffering. Disabling Nagle’s algorithm will enable the application to have many small packets in flight on the network at once, instead of a smaller number of large packets, which may increase load on the network, and may or may not benefit the application performance.

Interactions with real-time systems
Applications that expect real-time responses and low latency can react poorly with Nagle's algorithm. Applications such as networked multiplayer video games or the movement of the mouse in a remotely controlled operating system, expect that actions are sent immediately, while the algorithm purposefully delays transmission, increasing bandwidth efficiency at the expense of latency. For this reason applications with low-bandwidth time-sensitive transmissions typically use TCP_NODELAY to bypass the Nagle-delayed ACK delay.

Another option is to use UDP instead.

Operating systems implementation 
Most modern operating systems implement Nagle's algorithms. In AIX, Linux, and Windows it is enabled by default and can be disabled on a per-socket basis using the TCP_NODELAY option.

References

External links
Nagle delays in Nagle's Algorithm
Nagle's algorithm
TCP Performance problems caused by interaction between Nagle's Algorithm and Delayed ACK
Design issues - Sending small data segments over TCP with Winsock

Networking algorithms
Transmission Control Protocol